Ebrahimabad (also Romanized as Ebrāhīmābād; also known as Ebrāhīmābād-e Qareh Tappeh, Qarah Tappeh, and Qareh Tappeh) is a village in Deh Chal Rural District, in the Central District of Khondab County, Markazi Province, Iran. At the 2006 census, its population was 302, in 69 families.

References 

Populated places in Khondab County